Lidia Szczerbińska (born 30 April 1934) is a Polish gymnast. She competed in seven events at the 1956 Summer Olympics, winning a bronze medal.

References

1934 births
Living people
Polish female artistic gymnasts
Olympic gymnasts of Poland
Gymnasts at the 1956 Summer Olympics
Gymnasts from Warsaw
Olympic medalists in gymnastics
Olympic bronze medalists for Poland
Medalists at the 1956 Summer Olympics